Mauri Franco Barbosa da Silva (born 6 March 1993), simply known as Mauri, is a Brazilian footballer who plays for Jacuipense as a defensive midfielder.

Club career
Born in Catu, Bahia, Mauri represented Vitória as a youth. He made his first team debut on 9 February 2014, starting in a 4–1 Campeonato Baiano away win against Serrano.

Mauri made his Série A debut on 27 April 2014, coming on as a second half substitute for Caio in a 2–2 home draw against Atlético Paranaense. On 11 September, he was loaned to Icasa until the end of the year.

On 6 August 2015 Mauri moved abroad, signing a one-year loan deal with Spanish Segunda División B club Real Balompédica Linense.

References

External links

1993 births
Living people
Sportspeople from Bahia
Brazilian footballers
Brazilian expatriate footballers
Association football midfielders
Campeonato Brasileiro Série A players
Campeonato Brasileiro Série B players
Campeonato Brasileiro Série D players
Segunda División B players
Esporte Clube Vitória players
Associação Desportiva Recreativa e Cultural Icasa players
Real Balompédica Linense footballers
Esporte Clube Jacuipense players
Expatriate footballers in Spain
Brazilian expatriate sportspeople in Spain